The Newport 212 is an American trailerable sailboat that was designed by Harry R. Sindle as a pocket cruiser and first built in 1972.

Production
The design was built by Newport Boats in Newport, California, United States, from 1972 until 1976, but it is now out of production.

Design
The Newport 212 is a recreational keelboat, built predominantly of fiberglass, with wood trim. It has a fractional sloop rig, a spooned raked stem, a reverse transom, a transom-hung rudder controlled by a tiller and a retractable swing keel. It displaces  and carries  of ballast.

The boat is normally fitted with a small  outboard motor for docking and maneuvering.

The design has sleeping accommodation for four people, with a double "V"-berth in the bow cabin and two straight settee berths in the main cabin along with a drop leaf table. The optional galley is located on the starboard side just forward of the companionway ladder over the starboard berth.

Operational history
In a 2010 review Steve Henkel wrote, "... best features: The biggest advantage of the 212 over her comp[etitor]s is her higher Space Index, a result of comparatively generous freeboard. We also like her spacious cabin layout, complete with dropleaf table, and her shallow draft and smooth bottom with board up, intimating an easy trip on and off a trailer. And her specs make her look faster than her PHRF rating of 267 would indicate, in spite of a somewhat lower S/D, and an extra 100 pounds of displacement compared to her comp[etitor]s. Worst features: Immediately noticeable in her inboard profile drawing is her unusual centerboard lifting gear and storage position, All we can say is that it looks complicated, and when it comes to centerboard arrangements, after some bad experiences, we have come to prefer simple."

See also
List of sailing boat types

References

1970s sailboat type designs
Keelboats
Sailing yachts
Trailer sailers
Sailboat type designs by Harry R. Sindle
Sailboat types built by Newport Boats